Rooplal Somani was an Indian politician.  He was elected to the Lok Sabha, the lower house of the Parliament of India from Bhilwara, Rajasthan as a member of the Janata Party.

References

External links
  Official biographical sketch in Parliament of India website

1917 births
Year of death missing
India MPs 1977–1979
Lok Sabha members from Rajasthan
Janata Party politicians
Indian National Congress politicians